Ogden Heights is a flattish, mainly ice-covered heights, about 7 nautical miles (13 km) long, forming a part of the south wall of upper Priestley Glacier to the southeast of Tantalus Peak, Victoria Land. The heights are near where the southern party of the New Zealand Geological Survey Antarctic Expedition (NZGSAE), 1962–63, was landed. Named by them for Lieutenant John H. Ogden, U.S. Navy, pilot who airlifted the party to this point, flew in their resupply, and later flew the party back to base at the end of the season.

Mountains of Victoria Land
Pennell Coast